Crystal Telecom Rwanda, commonly referred to as Crystal Telecom, is a Rwanda Stock Exchange listed company with its headquarters in Kigali, Rwanda. The firm holds a 20 percent stake in MTN Rwandancell as its only investment.

Location
Crystal Telecom maintains its headquarters in the offices of Crystal Ventures, at Grand Pension Plaza, on the 14th Floor, at 2 KN 3 Avenue, in Kigali, Rwanda's capital and largest city. The geographical coordinates of the company's headquarters are:01°56'47.2"S, 30°03'37.4"E (Latitude:-1.946444; Longitude:30.060389).

Overview
Crystal Telecom is a special purpose vehicle company that owns 20 percent of MTN Rwandacell, a member of the MTN Group. As of 2015, that shareholding was its only investment. As of December 2019, Crystal Telecom had total assets of RWF:24.038 billion (US$26 million), with shareholders equity of RWF:23,971 billion (US$25.9 million).

History
Crystal Telecom was formed in 2013 when Rwanda based investment firm Crystal Ventures, spun off its shareholding in MTN Rwandantell to its newly incorporated subsidiary through an  IPO. The IPO was conducted in June 2015 and was over-subscribed by 123 percent. 

The company's shares started trading on the Rwanda Stock Exchange on 17 July 2015 under the symbol CTL, making it the third local company to list on the exchange, behind Bralirwa and Bank of Kigali.

Governance
The company is supervised by a five-person board of directors. The table below illustrates the members of the board as of 31 December 2017. Evelyn Kamagaju Rutawenda was the chairperson and Iza Irame was the chief executive officer.

See also 

 MTN Group
 Rwanda Stock Exchange

References

External links
 Official Website

2013 establishments in Rwanda
Companies listed on the Rwanda Stock Exchange
Telecommunications companies established in 2013
Organisations based in Kigali
Economy of Kigali
Telecommunications companies of Rwanda